The Departmental Council of Loire-Atlantique, called the 'General Council of Loire-Inférieure' between 1800 and 1957, then 'General Council of Loire-Atlantique' until 2015, is the deliberative assembly of the French department of Loire-Atlantique. Its headquarters are in Nantes.

Executive

The President 
The president of the Loire-Atlantique departmental council has been Michel Ménard (PS) since July 1, 2021.

The vice-presidents 
The president of the departmental council is assisted by 15 vice-presidents chosen from among the departmental councillors. Each of them has a delegation of authority.

Composition 
The Loire-Atlantique departmental council includes 62 departmental councilors from each of the 31 cantons of Loire-Atlantique.

The delegations 
The departmental council has decentralized part of its services within six territorial delegations. These bring together services dedicated to solidarity, planning and local development.

 Delegation of Nantes, located at 26 Boulevard Victor Hugo, Nantes, it covers the territory of the Nantes Metropolis.
 Delegation of Saint-Nazaire, located at 12, place Pierre-Semard in Saint-Nazaire and 90 rue Maurice Sambron in Pontchâteau.
 Delegation of Pays de Retz, located at 10-12, rue du Docteur-Guilmin in Pornic and 6, rue Galilée in Machecoul.
 Delegation of Châteaubriant , located at 10, rue d'Ancenis in Châteaubriant and at 29, route de Nantes in Nozay.
 Delegation of Vignoble, located at 2, cours des Marches-de-Bretagne in Clisson.
 Delegation of Ancenis, located at 118, place du Maréchal-Foch in Ancenis.

Headquarters 

The department's administrative services building, less than 100 meters from the department hall, dates from 2011, and was built on the site of Nantes' first power plant (1891), whose new building preserved three stone portals of the facade.

References 

Loire-Atlantique
Loire-Atlantique
Politics of Pays de la Loire